Sammarinese euro coins feature separate designs for every coin. All the coins are inscribed with the words "San Marino" and the twelve stars of the EU. The Sammarinese euro coins are minted by Istituto Poligrafico e Zecca dello Stato (IPZS), in Rome, Italy.

First Sammarinese euro design (2002–16)
For images of the common side and a detailed description of the coins, see euro coins.

Second Sammarinese euro design (2017–present)

Circulating mintage quantities

Commemorative coins

The Republic, just like the other European states who have the right to issue euro coins, issues commemorative coins, of which the most notorious denomination is €2. The Republic has also issued commemorative euro coins in other denominations, such as the 2014 €5 coin dedicated to three-time Formula One World Champion Ayrton Senna in 2014, being 20 years from Senna's fatal crash at the San Marino Grand Prix. This coin was also complemented by a commemorative €2.50 stamp.

Notes

See also
 Sammarinese lira
 San Marino–European Union relations

References

External links

Euro coins by issuing country
Euro coins